The North West Mount Chappell Islet, part of the Badger Group within the Furneaux Group, is a  unpopulated mainly granite islet, in Bass Strait, lying west of the Flinders and Cape Barren islands, Tasmania, south of Victoria, in south-eastern Australia. The island is located within a conservation area and is part of the Chalky, Big Green and Badger Island Groups Important Bird Area.

Fauna
Recorded breeding seabird and wader species are little penguin, Pacific gull, silver gull, sooty oystercatcher, black-faced cormorant and Caspian tern.

See also

 List of islands of Tasmania

References

Furneaux Group
Protected areas of Tasmania
Important Bird Areas of Tasmania
Islands of Bass Strait
Islands of North East Tasmania